The year 1967 in film involved some significant events. It is widely considered one of the most ground-breaking years in American cinema, with "revolutionary" films highlighting the shift towards forward thinking European standards at the time, including: Bonnie and Clyde, The Graduate, Guess Who's Coming to Dinner, Cool Hand Luke, The Dirty Dozen, In Cold Blood, In the Heat of the Night, The Jungle Book and You Only Live Twice.

Highest-grossing films

North America

The top ten 1967 released films by box office gross in North America are as follows:

Outside North America
The highest-grossing 1967 films in countries outside North America.

Events
 The prototype for the IMAX large-format-film acquisition and screening system is exhibited at Expo 67 in Montreal, Quebec, Canada
 The MPAA adopts a new logo, which is still used today.
 July 8 - Vivien Leigh, best known for Gone with the Wind and A Streetcar Named Desire, dies from tuberculosis.
 July 15 — Seven Arts Productions acquire substantially all the assets and business of Warner Bros. creating Warner Bros.-Seven Arts. 
 August 13 — Bonnie and Clyde, starring Warren Beatty, Faye Dunaway, and Gene Hackman, premieres. It broke many taboos of its time, such as the visual depiction of violence. It has been considered a landmark film in Hollywood filmmaking, with its groundbreaking and ingenious visual styles. The success of Bonnie and Clyde helped bring forth the New Hollywood era, a period of artistic and commercial renewal.
 October 18 — Walt Disney's production of Rudyard Kipling's The Jungle Book premieres. It was the last animated feature film to be personally supervised by Disney before his death the previous year. It was also one of the last Disney films to be personally approved by him, along with The Happiest Millionaire and Winnie the Pooh and the Blustery Day. The story's moral message of friendship, love, and trust have been embraced by critics and audiences worldwide. The Jungle Book is notable for its realistic character animation and voice casting. The film's soundtrack, which includes the Academy Award-nominated "The Bare Necessities", '"I Wan'na Be Like You", "Trust in Me", and "My Own Home", also contributed to the film's enormous success. It would be the most successful animated film to be made by Disney until The Rescuers, ten years later.
 December 21 — The Graduate, starring Dustin Hoffman (in his acting film debut), Anne Bancroft, and Katharine Ross, premieres. It tells a story of an aimless young man, seduced and betrayed by an older woman, while falling in love with her daughter. The theme of an innocent and confused youth who is exploited, misdirected, seduced (literally and figuratively), and betrayed by a corrupt, decadent, and discredited older generation (that finds its stability in the film's keyword "plastics") was well understood by film audiences and captured the spirit of the times, in light of the assassination of U.S. President John F. Kennedy in 1963 and the increasing turbulence in American society in the mid-to-late 1960s. Like Bonnie and Clyde, The Graduate broke many well-established taboos in American cinema, and represents a new era in groundbreaking achievements in filmmaking.

Awards 

Palme d'Or (Cannes Film Festival):
Blowup, directed by Michelangelo Antonioni, Italy

Golden Lion (Venice Film Festival):
Belle de jour, directed by Luis Buñuel, France / Italy

Golden Bear (Berlin Film Festival):
Le départ, directed by Jerzy Skolimowski, Belgium

1967 film releases
US unless stated

January–March
January 1967
5 January
A Countess from Hong Kong (U.K.)
18 January
The Born Losers
Come Spy with Me
The Venetian Affair
Warning Shot
19 January
Hotel
25 January
First to Fight
26 January
The Deadly Affair (U.K.)
27 January
Hot Rods to Hell
February 1967
1 February
The Ballad of Josie
3 February
The Corrupt Ones (West Germany)/(Italy)/ (France)
7 February
Tobruk
8 February
Monkeys, Go Home!
9 February
Accident (U.K.)
Hurry Sundown
10 February
The Night of the Generals (U.K.)/ (France)
12 February
Deadlier Than the Male (U.K.)
15 February
A Covenant with Death
Oh Dad, Poor Dad, Mamma's Hung You in the Closet and I'm Feelin' So Sad
18 February
Good Morning and... Goodbye!
22 February
Marat/Sade (U.K.)
25 February
Enter Laughing
28 February
Privilege (U.K.)
March 1967
1 March
The Happening
8 March
The Adventures of Bullwhip Griffin
Mad Monster Party?
The Taming of the Shrew (Italy/U.S.)
The Young Girls of Rochefort (France)
9 March
How to Succeed in Business Without Really Trying
12 March
The Busy Body
13 March
The House of 1,000 Dolls
14 March
Ulysses
15 March
Frankenstein Created Woman (U.K.)
In Like Flint
Gamera vs. Gyaos (Japan)
18 March
Riot on Sunset Strip
21 March
Hombre
Thoroughly Modern Millie
22 March
Easy Come, Easy Go
Thunder Alley
25 March
The X from Outer Space (Japan)
26 March
The Desperate Ones
31 March
The Champagne Murders

April–June
April 1967
1 April
Kidnapping, Caucasian Style (U.S.S.R)
12 April
The Cool Ones
13 April
Casino Royale (U.K./U.S.)
14 April
It's a Bikini World
18 April
Caprice
22 April
Gappa: The Triphibian Monster (Japan)
24 April
A Stranger in Town (Italy/U.S.)
28 April
Devil's Angels
Doctor, You've Got to Be Kidding!
29 April
Eight on the Lam
May 1967
1 May
40 Guns to Apache Pass
They Came from Beyond Space (U.K.)
Welcome to Hard Times
3 May
Bikini Paradise
The Vulture (U.K.)
12 May
Good Times
15 May
The Jokers (U.K.)
17 May
Dont Look Back
The Million Eyes of Sumuru (U.K.)
22 May
The Honey Pot
24 May
Belle de Jour (France)
The Caper of the Golden Bulls
Double Trouble
Three Bites of the Apple
The Way West
25 May
Barefoot in the Park
A Guide for the Married Man
The Vengeance of Fu Manchu (U.K.)
26 May
Catalina Caper
27 May
Samurai Rebellion (Japan)
The War Wagon
June 1967
9 June
Don't Make Waves
11 June
Snow White and the Seven Dwarfs (re-release)
13 June
You Only Live Twice (U.K./U.S.)
14 June
To Sir, with Love
15 June
Branded to Kill (Japan)
The Dirty Dozen
16 June
The Reluctant Astronaut
18 June
The Mummy's Shroud
21 June
Divorce American Style
23 June
The Happiest Millionaire
27 June
The Shuttered Room (U.K.)
Woman Times Seven
28 June
Gunn
30 June
The St. Valentine's Day Massacre

July–September
July 1967
6 July
The Sorcerers
12 July
The Big Mouth
Common Law Cabin
The Gnome-Mobile
13 July
Jules Verne's Rocket to the Moon (U.K.)
19 July
The Naked Runner
Up the Down Staircase
21 July
War and Peace Part III (U.S.S.R)
22 July
King Kong Escapes (Japan)
23 July
Chuka
26 July
The Love-Ins
Luv
27 July
The Long Duel
August 1967
1 August
Rough Night in Jericho
2 August
In the Heat of the Night
The Perils of Pauline
3 August
Beach Red
12 August
Japan's Longest Day (Japan)
13 August
Bonnie and Clyde
Yongary, Monster from the Deep (South Korea)
18 August
The Tiger Makes Out
22 August
The Flim-Flam Man
23 August
The Thief of Paris (France)
The Whisperers (U.K.)
30 August
Point Blank
31 August
The Trip
September 1967
1 September
The Fastest Guitar Alive
Tarzan and the Great River
8 September
Fort Utah
14 September
Our Mother's House (U.K.)
17 September
Games
20 September
Two for the Road
22 September
Robbery
26 September
Who's Minding the Mint?
28 September
The Bobo

October–December
October 1967
1 October
Fathom (U.K.)
3 October
Titicut Follies
9 October
I Am Curious (Sweden)
13 October
Reflections in a Golden Eye
16 October
Far from the Madding Crowd (U.K.)
Hamraaz (India)
18 October
Charlie, the Lonesome Cougar
Clambake
The Jungle Book
19 October
Doctor Faustus
23 October
How I Won the War (U.K.)
25 October
Camelot
26 October
Wait Until Dark
31 October
The Comedians
November 1967
1 November
Cool Hand Luke
Hour of the Gun
A Time for Killing
4 November
War and Peace Part IV (U.S.S.R)
5 November
The Incident
9 November
Custer of the West
Quatermass and the Pit (U.K.)
10 November
Berserk!
Jack of Diamonds
Tony Rome
13 November
The Fearless Vampire Killers
15 November
Gentle Giant
Who's That Knocking at My Door
22 November
The Producers
Rosie!
December 1967
1 December
Hells Angels on Wheels
5 December
Festival
Poor Cow (U.K.)
6 December
Kill a Dragon
10 December
Bedazzled (U.K.)
12 December
Guess Who's Coming to Dinner
13 December
The Fox
14 December
Follow That Camel
In Cold Blood
15 December
Carry On Doctor (U.K.)
Valley of the Dolls
16 December
Playtime (France/Italy)
Son of Godzilla (Japan)
17 December
Banning
18 December
I'll Never Forget What's'isname (U.K.)
19 December
Doctor Dolittle
20 December
Billion Dollar Brain (U.K.)/(U.S)
Fitzwilly
21 December
The Graduate
The President's Analyst
22 December
The Ambusheers
26 December
Magical Mystery Tour (U.K.)
27 December
The Last Challenge
Smashing Time (U.K.)
29 December
Weekend (France)

Notable films released in 1967
U.S. unless stated

#
40 Guns to Apache Pass, starring Audie Murphy
 Two or Three Things I Know About Her (2 ou 3 choses que je sais d'elle), directed by Jean-Luc Godard – (France)
 The 25th Hour, starring Anthony Quinn and Virna Lisi – (France/Italy/Romania)

A
 Accident, directed by Joseph Losey, starring Dirk Bogarde and Stanley Baker – (U.K.)
 The Adventures of Bullwhip Griffin, starring Roddy McDowall, Suzanne Pleshette, and Karl Malden
 The Ambushers, starring Dean Martin (as Matt Helm)
 The Andromeda Nebula – (USSR)
 Anna Karenina – (USSR)

B
 The Ballad of Josie, starring Doris Day
 Banning, starring Robert Wagner, Jill St. John, Susan Clark, Gene Hackman
 Barefoot in the Park, starring Robert Redford and Jane Fonda
Battle Beneath the Earth, starring Kerwin Mathews and Peter Arne – (U.K.)
 Beach Red, starring Cornel Wilde and Rip Torn
 Bedazzled, directed by Stanley Donen, starring Peter Cook, Dudley Moore, Raquel Welch – (U.K.)
 Belle de jour, directed by Luis Buñuel, starring Catherine Deneuve - winner of Golden Lion – (France)
 Berserk!, starring Joan Crawford – (U.K.)
 Bewitched Love (El amor brujo) – (Spain)
 The Big Mouth, directed by and starring Jerry Lewis
 Billion Dollar Brain, directed by Ken Russell, starring Michael Caine – (U.K.)
 The Birch Tree (Breza), directed by Ante Babaja – (Yugoslavia)
 The Blood Demon (Die Schlangengrube und das Pendel, a.k.a. The Torture Chamber of Dr. Sadism), directed by Harald Reinl – (West Germany)
 The Bobo, starring Peter Sellers, Britt Ekland, Adolfo Celi, Rossano Brazzi, Al Lettieri – (U.K.)
 Bonnie and Clyde, directed by Arthur Penn, starring Warren Beatty, Faye Dunaway, Gene Hackman, Estelle Parsons, Michael J. Pollard
 Born Losers, directed by and starring Tom Laughlin
 Branded to Kill (Koroshi no rakuin), directed by Seijun Suzuki – (Japan)
 The Busy Body, starring Sid Caesar, Robert Ryan, Jan Murray, Arlene Golonka, Richard Pryor

C
 Camelot, a musical directed by Joshua Logan, starring Richard Harris, Vanessa Redgrave, Franco Nero, with songs by Lerner and Loewe
The Cape Town Affair, starring James Brolin and Jacqueline Bisset
 Caprice, starring Doris Day and Richard Harris
 Carry On Doctor, starring Frankie Howerd and Sid James – (U.K.)
 Case of the Naves Brothers (O Caso dos Irmãos Naves) – (Brazil)
 Casino Royale, starring David Niven, Peter Sellers, Ursula Andress, Woody Allen, Daliah Lavi, Barbara Bouchet – (U.K.)
 Catalina Caper, starring Tommy Kirk
 Cervantes, starring Horst Buchholz and Gina Lollobrigida – (Spain/France/Italy)
 The Champagne Murders (Le scandale), directed by Claude Chabrol and starring Anthony Perkins – (France)
 Charlie Bubbles, directed by and starring Albert Finney with Billie Whitelaw and Liza Minnelli – (U.K.)
 China Is Near (La Cina è vicina) – (Italy)
 La Chinoise, directed by Jean-Luc Godard – (France)
 Chuka, starring Rod Taylor, Ernest Borgnine, John Mills
 Clambake, starring Elvis Presley and Shelley Fabares
 The Collector (La collectionneuse), directed by Éric Rohmer – (France)
 The College Girl Murders (Der Mönch mit der Peitsche, a.k.a. The Monk with the Whip), directed by Alfred Vohrer – (West Germany)
 A Colt Is My Passport (Koruto wa ore no pasupoto), starring Joe Shishido – (Japan)
 Come Spy with Me, starring Troy Donahue
 The Comedians, starring Richard Burton, Elizabeth Taylor, Alec Guinness
 Commissar – (USSR)
 Cool Hand Luke, directed by Stuart Rosenberg, starring Paul Newman and George Kennedy
 Counterpoint, starring Charlton Heston
 A Countess from Hong Kong, directed by Charlie Chaplin, starring Marlon Brando and Sophia Loren – (U.K.)
 Custer of the West, starring Robert Shaw, Mary Ure and Robert Ryan

D
 Day of Anger (I giorni dell'ira), starring Lee Van Cleef – (Italy)
 A Degree of Murder (Mord und Totschlag), directed by Volker Schlöndorff, starring Anita Pallenberg – (West Germany)
 The Departure (Le départ), directed by Jerzy Skolimowski, starring Jean-Pierre Léaud – (Belgium)
 Deadlier Than the Male, starring Richard Johnson and Elke Sommer – (U.K.)
 The Deadly Affair, directed by Sidney Lumet, starring James Mason and Simone Signoret – (U.K.)
 Death Rides a Horse (Da uomo a uomo), starring Lee Van Cleef and John Phillip Law – (Italy)
 Diabolically Yours (Diaboliquement vôtre), starring Alain Delon and Senta Berger – (France/Italy/West Germany)
 The Dirty Dozen, directed by Robert Aldrich, starring Lee Marvin and an ensemble cast
 Divorce American Style, starring Dick Van Dyke, Debbie Reynolds, Jason Robards, Jean Simmons
 Doctor Dolittle, a musical directed by Richard Fleischer, starring Rex Harrison, Samantha Eggar, Anthony Newley
 Doctor Faustus, directed by Richard Burton and Nevill Coghill – (U.K.)
 Doctor, You've Got to Be Kidding!, starring Sandra Dee and George Hamilton
 Dont Look Back, a documentary by D. A. Pennebaker, featuring Bob Dylan
 Don't Make Waves, starring Tony Curtis, Claudia Cardinale, Sharon Tate
 Double Trouble, starring Elvis Presley
 Dragon Gate Inn (Lóng mén kè zhàn) (international release), directed by King Hu – (Taiwan)

E
 Easy Come, Easy Go, starring Elvis Presley
 Eight on the Lam, starring Bob Hope, Jonathan Winters, Shirley Eaton, Jill St. John
 Elvira Madigan, directed by Bo Widerberg – (Sweden)
 Entranced Earth (Terra em Transe), directed by Glauber Rocha – (Brazil)
 An Evening in Paris, starring Shammi Kapoor – (India)
 The Exchange Student (Les grandes vacances), directed by Jean Girault – (France/Italy)

F
 Faccia a faccia (Face to Face), starring Gian Maria Volonté – (Italy)
 Far from the Madding Crowd, directed by John Schlesinger, starring Julie Christie, Terence Stamp, Peter Finch, Alan Bates – (U.K.)
 The Fastest Guitar Alive, starring Roy Orbison
 Fathom, starring Raquel Welch – (U.K.)
 The Fearless Vampire Killers, directed by Roman Polanski, starring Sharon Tate – (U.K./U.S.)
 Festival, a documentary about Newport Folk Festival
 The Firemen's Ball (Hoří, má panenko), directed by Miloš Forman – (Czechoslovakia)
 Fitzwilly, starring Dick Van Dyke and Barbara Feldon
 The Flim-Flam Man, starring George C. Scott, Michael Sarrazin
 Follow That Camel (a.k.a. Carry On...Follow That Camel), starring Phil Silvers and Kenneth Williams – (U.K.)
 Fort Utah, starring John Ireland and Virginia Mayo
 The Fox, starring Sandy Dennis, Anne Heywood, Keir Dullea
 Frankenstein Created Woman, starring Peter Cushing – (U.K.)
 The Frozen Dead, starring Dana Andrews, Anna Palk

G
 Games, starring Simone Signoret, Katharine Ross and James Caan
 The Good, the Bad and the Ugly, directed by Sergio Leone, starring Clint Eastwood, Lee Van Cleef and Eli Wallach – (Italy)
 Good Times, starring Sonny & Cher
 The Graduate, directed by Mike Nichols, starring Dustin Hoffman, Anne Bancroft and Katharine Ross
 Grand Slam, starring Janet Leigh and Edward G. Robinson – (Italy/Spain/West Germany)
 Guess Who's Coming to Dinner, directed by Stanley Kramer, starring Spencer Tracy, Katharine Hepburn and Sidney Poitier
 A Guide for the Married Man, directed by Gene Kelly, starring Walter Matthau, Inger Stevens and Robert Morse
 Gunfight in Abilene, starring Bobby Darin
 Gunn, starring Craig Stevens

H
 Half a Sixpence, starring Tommy Steele – (U.K.)
 Hatey Bazarey (The Market Place), starring Ashok Kumar and Vyjayanthimala – (India)
 Hamraaz, starring Sunil Dutt and Raaj Kumar – (India)
 The Happening, starring Anthony Quinn, Michael Parks, Faye Dunaway
 The Happiest Millionaire, starring Fred MacMurray, Greer Garson, Tommy Steele, Lesley Ann Warren, John Davidson
 The Heathens of Kummerow (Die Heiden von Kummerow und ihre lustigen Streiche), the first co-production between East Germany and West Germany
 Hell on Wheels, starring Marty Robbins
 Hells Angels on Wheels, starring Jack Nicholson
 Herostratus, directed by Don Levy – (Australia/U.K.)
 Hombre, directed by Martin Ritt, starring Paul Newman, Fredric March, Diane Cilento, Richard Boone, Martin Balsam, Barbara Rush
 The Honey Pot, starring Rex Harrison, Cliff Robertson, Susan Hayward, Edie Adams
 Hotel, directed by Richard Quine, starring Rod Taylor, Melvyn Douglas, Karl Malden, Catherine Spaak, Merle Oberon
 Hour of the Gun, directed by John Sturges, starring James Garner, Jason Robards, Robert Ryan
 The House of 1,000 Dolls, starring Vincent Price – (Spain/West Germany)
 How I Won The War, directed by Richard Lester, starring Michael Crawford, John Lennon Michael Hordern – (U.K.)
 How to Succeed in Business Without Really Trying, starring Robert Morse, Michele Lee, Rudy Vallée, Maureen Arthur
 Hurry Sundown, directed by Otto Preminger, starring Jane Fonda, Michael Caine, Diahann Carroll, Beah Richards, Faye Dunaway

I
 I, a Man, directed by Andy Warhol
 I Am Curious (Yellow) (Jag är nyfiken – en film i gult) – (Sweden)
 I Even Met Happy Gypsies (Skupljači perja) – (Yugoslavia)
 In Cold Blood, directed by Richard Brooks, starring Robert Blake, Scott Wilson, Paul Stewart, John Forsythe
 I'll Never Forget What's 'isname, directed by Michael Winner, starring Oliver Reed and Orson Welles – (U.K.)
 In Like Flint, starring James Coburn, Lee J. Cobb, Jean Hale
 In the Heat of the Night, directed by Norman Jewison, starring Sidney Poitier and Rod Steiger—winner of 5 Academy Awards including best picture
 The Incident, starring Martin Sheen and Beau Bridges
 It's a Bikini World, starring Deborah Walley and Tommy Kirk

J
 Jewel Thief, starring Dev Anand, Vyjayanthimala and Ashok Kumar – (India)
 The Jokers, directed by Michael Winner, starring Oliver Reed and Michael Crawford – (U.K.)
 Journey to the Center of Time, directed by David L. Hewitt
 Jules Verne's Rocket to the Moon, directed by Don Sharp – (U.K.)
 The Jungle Book, directed by Wolfgang Reitherman, an animated musical by Walt Disney Productions

K
 Kidnapping, Caucasian Style (Kavkazskaya plennitsa, ili Novie priklucheniya Shurika) – (USSR)
 King Kong Escapes (Kingu Kongu no gyakushû) – (Japan/U.S.)
 The King's Pirate, starring Doug McClure and Jill St. John
 Kinoautomat – (Czechoslovakia)
 Kyu-chan no Dekkai Yume – (Japan)

L
 The Last Adventure (Les aventuriers), directed by Robert Enrico – (France/Italy)
 The Last Killer (L'ultimo killer, a.k.a. Django the Last Killer), starring George Eastman and Anthony Ghidra
 A Long Journey (Largo viaje) – (Chile)
 The Long Duel, starring Yul Brynner, Trevor Howard, Harry Andrews and Charlotte Rampling – (U.K.)
 Love Affair, or the Case of the Missing Switchboard Operator (Ljubavni slučaj ili tragedija službenice P.T.T.) – (Yugoslavia)

M
 Mad Monster Party?, animated film featuring Boris Karloff
 Magical Mystery Tour - TV film with the Beatles – (U.K.)
 Maneater of Hydra, directed by Mel Welles – (Spain/West Germany)
 A Man Vanishes (Ningen Johatsu), directed by Shohei Imamura – (Japan)
 Marat/Sade, directed by Peter Brook – (U.K.)
 Marketa Lazarová, directed by František Vláčil – (Czechoslovakia)
The Million Eyes of Sumuru, starring George Nader, Frankie Avalon and Shirley Eaton – (U.K.)
 The Mitten (Varezhka), directed by Roman Kachanov – (USSR)
 More Than a Miracle (C'era una volta), starring Sophia Loren, Omar Sharif and Dolores del Río – (Italy/France)
 Mouchette, directed by Robert Bresson – (France)
 The Mummy's Shroud, starring André Morell and John Phillips – (U.K.)

N
 The Naked Runner, directed by Sidney J. Furie, starring Frank Sinatra – (U.K.)
 The Night of the Generals, starring Peter O'Toole, Omar Sharif, Tom Courtenay – (U.K./France)

O
 Oedipus Rex (Edipo Re), directed by Pier Paolo Pasolini, starring Silvana Mangano – (Italy)
 Oh Dad, Poor Dad, Mamma's Hung You in the Closet and I'm Feelin' So Sad, starring Rosalind Russell and Robert Morse
 One-Armed Swordsman (Dubei dao), directed by Chang Cheh – (Hong Kong)
 Oscar, directed by Édouard Molinaro – (France)
 Our Mother's House, starring Dirk Bogarde – (U.K.)

P
 Paranoia – (Netherlands)
 Pedro Páramo, starring John Gavin – (Mexico)
 Peppermint Frappé, directed by Carlos Saura – (Spain)
 The Plank, directed by and starring Eric Sykes with Tommy Cooper – (U.K.)
 Playing Soldiers (Mali vojnici) – (Yugoslavia)
 Playtime, directed by and starring Jacques Tati – (France)
 Point Blank, directed by John Boorman, starring Lee Marvin and Angie Dickinson
 Poor Cow, directed by Ken Loach, starring Terence Stamp and Carol White – (U.K.)
 The President's Analyst, starring James Coburn
 Privilege, directed by Peter Watkins, starring Paul Jones and Jean Shrimpton – (U.K.)

Q
 Quatermass and the Pit, starring James Donald – (U.K.)

R
 Ram Aur Shyam (Ram and Shyam), starring Dilip Kumar – (India)
 The Rats Woke Up (Buđenje pacova) – (Yugoslavia)
 The Red and the White (Csillagosok, katonak), directed by Miklós Jancsó – (Hungary)
 Reflections in a Golden Eye, directed by John Huston, starring Marlon Brando and Elizabeth Taylor
 The Reluctant Astronaut, starring Don Knotts
 The Ride to Hangman's Tree, directed by Alan Rafkin
 Robbery, directed by Peter Yates, starring Stanley Baker – (U.K.)
 Rosie!, starring Rosalind Russell
 Rough Night in Jericho, starring Dean Martin and George Peppard

S
The Sailor from Gibraltar, starring Ian Bannen, Jeanne Moreau, Vanessa Redgrave, Orson Welles – (U.K.)
 The St. Valentine's Day Massacre, starring Jason Robards, George Segal, Ralph Meeker and Jean Hale
 Le samouraï (The Samurai), starring Alain Delon – (France)
 Samurai Rebellion (Jōi-uchi: Hairyō tsuma shimatsu), directed by Masaki Kobayashi, starring Toshiro Mifune – (Japan)
 The Shooting, starring Warren Oates, Millie Perkins and Jack Nicholson
 The Shuttered Room, starring Gig Young, Carol Lynley and Oliver Reed – (U.K.)
 Slave Girls, starring Martine Beswick and Michael Latimer – (U.K.)
Smashing Time, starring Rita Tushingham, Lynn Redgrave and Michael York – (U.K.)
 Soleil O, written and directed by Med Hondo (Mauritania/France)
The Sorcerers, directed by Michael Reeves, starring Boris Karloff and Ian Ogilvy – (U.K.)
 Son of Godzilla, directed by Jun Fukuda – (Japan)
 Stimulantia, anthology film by nine directors – (Sweden)
 The Stolen Airship (Ukradená vzducholoď), directed by Karel Zeman – (Czechoslovakia/Italy)
 The Stranger (Lo straniero), directed by Luchino Visconti, starring Marcello Mastroianni – (Italy)
 Stranger in the House, starring James Mason, Geraldine Chaplin and Bobby Darin  – (U.K.)
 A Stranger in Town (Un dollaro tra i denti), directed by Luigi Vanzi – (Italy/U.S.)
 Sweet Love, Bitter, starring Dick Gregory

T
 The Taming of the Shrew, directed by Franco Zeffirelli, starring Richard Burton and Elizabeth Taylor – (Italy/U.S.)
 Ten Thousand Days (Tízezer nap) – (Hungary)
 The Thief of Paris, directed by Louis Malle and starring Jean-Paul Belmondo and Geneviève Bujold – (France)
 They Came from Beyond Space, directed by Freddie Francis – (U.K.)
 This Night I'll Possess Your Corpse (Esta Noite Encarnarei no Teu Cadáver) – (Brazil)
 Thoroughly Modern Millie, directed by George Roy Hill, starring Julie Andrews, Mary Tyler Moore, Carol Channing
 Thunder Alley, directed by Richard Rush, starring Annette Funicello
 The Tied Up Balloon, directed by Binka Zhelyazkova and starring Georgi Partsalev, Grigor Vachkov, Georgi Kaloyanchev, Konstantin Kotsev – (Bulgaria)
 The Tiger Makes Out, starring Eli Wallach and Anne Jackson
 The Tiger and the Pussycat, starring Vittorio Gassman, Ann-Margret, Eleanor Parker – (Italy)
 Titicut Follies, a documentary by Frederick Wiseman
 To Sir, with Love, starring Sidney Poitier – (U.K.)
 Tobruk, starring Rock Hudson and George Peppard
 Tony Rome, directed by Gordon Douglas, starring Frank Sinatra, Jill St. John, Gena Rowlands, Richard Conte, Sue Lyon
Torture Garden, starring Burgess Meredith, Michael Bryant, Beverly Adams, Peter Cushing, Jack Palance – (U.K.)
 The Trip, directed by Roger Corman, starring Peter Fonda and Susan Strasberg
 Two for the Road, directed by Stanley Donen, starring Audrey Hepburn and Albert Finney – (U.K.)
 The Two of Us (Le vieil homme et l'enfant), directed by Claude Berri – (France)

U
 Ultraman – (Japan)
 Ulysses, starring Milo O'Shea – (U.K./U.S.)
 Untamable Angelique (Indomptable Angélique), directed by Bernard Borderie – (France/Italy/West Germany)
 Up the Down Staircase, starring Sandy Dennis
 Upkar, directed by and starring Manoj Kumar – (India)

V
 Valley of the Dolls, directed by Mark Robson, starring Barbara Parkins, Patty Duke, Sharon Tate, Susan Hayward, Paul Burke, Lee Grant
 The Venetian Affair, starring Elke Sommer, Robert Vaughn, Felicia Farr
The Vengeance of Fu Manchu, starring Christopher Lee and Tony Ferrer – (U.K.)
 Violated Angels (Okasareta Hakui) – (Japan)
 Viy (aka Spirit of Evil) – (USSR)
The Vulture, starring Robert Hutton and Diane Clare – (U.K.)

W
 Wait Until Dark, directed by Terence Young, starring Audrey Hepburn, Alan Arkin, Richard Crenna, Jack Weston and Efrem Zimbalist, Jr.
 War and Peace (Voyna i mir), directed by Sergei Bondarchuk – (USSR)
 The War Wagon, directed by Burt Kennedy, starring John Wayne and Kirk Douglas
 Warning Shot, starring David Janssen, Stefanie Powers, Joan Collins, Eleanor Parker, Lillian Gish and George Sanders
 Waterhole No. 3, starring James Coburn, Carroll O'Connor and Margaret Blye
 The Way West, starring Kirk Douglas, Richard Widmark, Robert Mitchum, Lola Albright and Sally Field
 We Still Kill the Old Way (A ciascuno il suo), starring Gian Maria Volonté and Irene Papas – (Italy)
 Weekend (Week-end), directed by Jean-Luc Godard – (France)
 Welcome to Hard Times, starring Henry Fonda, Aldo Ray, Janice Rule and Warren Oates
 The Whisperers, starring Edith Evans and Nanette Newman – (U.K.)
 The White Bus, a short film by Lindsay Anderson – (U.K.)
 Who's Minding the Mint? starring Jim Hutton, Dorothy Provine, Walter Brennan and Milton Berle
 Who's That Knocking at My Door, directed by Martin Scorsese
 The Witches (Le streghe), produced by Dino De Laurentiis – (Italy/France)

Y
 You Only Live Twice, starring Sean Connery as James Bond – (U.K.)
 The Young Girls of Rochefort, directed by Jacques Demy, starring Catherine Deneuve and Françoise Dorléac – (France)

Short film series
 Looney Tunes (1930–1969)
 Merrie Melodies (1931–1969)
 Speedy Gonzales (1953–1968)
 Daffy Duck (1937–1968)
 Cool Cat (1967–1969)
 Merlin the Magic Mouse (1967–1969)

Births
 January 1 - Richard Leaf, English actor
 January 2
Tia Carrere, American actress
James Marshall (actor), American actor
 January 5 - Ross Mullan, Canadian-British actor and puppeteer
 January 7 - Irrfan Khan, Indian actor (d. 2020)
 January 10 - Trini Alvarado, American actress
 January 11 - Derek Riddell, Scottish actor
 January 12 - Vendela Kirsebom, Norwegian-Swedish model, television host and actress
 January 14
Kerri Green, American actress, director and screenwriter
Emily Watson, English actress
 January 17 - Song Kang-ho, South Korean actor
 January 20 - Stacey Dash, American actress
 January 23 - Steve Box, English animator and director
 January 24 - Phil LaMarr, American actor, voice actor, comedian and writer
 February 5 - Chris Parnell, American actor, voice artist and comedian
 February 6 - Michelle Thrush, Canadian actress and activist
 February 10 - Laura Dern, American actress
 February 13 – Carolyn Lawrence, American actress and voice actress
 February 19 - Benicio del Toro, Puerto Rican actor
 February 20
David Herman, American actor
Andrew Shue, American actor
Kath Soucie, American voice actress
Lili Taylor, American actress
 March 1
Rosyam Nor, Malaysian actor
Steffan Rhodri, Welsh actor
 March 4 - Sam Taylor-Johnson, born Samantha Taylor-Wood, English-born director
 March 6 - Connie Britton, American actress, singer and producer
 March 15 - Pierre Coffin, French voice actor, animator and film director, best known for voicing the Minions.
 March 16 - Lauren Graham, American actress
 March 27 - Talisa Soto, American actress
 March 30 - Megumi Hayashibara, Japanese voice actress, singer, lyricist and radio personality
 April 2 - Renée Estevez, American actress and screenwriter
 April 6 – Kathleen Barr, Canadian voice, stage and television actress
 April 17 - Kimberly Elise, American actress
 April 18 - Maria Bello, American actress
 April 22 - Sherri Shepherd, American actress, comedian, author and television personality
 April 23 - Melina Kanakaredes, American actress
 April 26 - Marianne Jean-Baptiste, English actress
 April 29 - Master P, American rapper and actor
 May 1
Scott Coffey, American actor/director
Tim McGraw, American country singer, songwriter and actor
 May 4 
Ana Gasteyer, American actress, comedian and singer
Akiko Yajima, Japanese voice actress
 May 15 - Madhuri Dixit, Indian actress
 May 18 - Bob Stephenson (actor), American actor
 May 31 - Sandrine Bonnaire, French actress
 June 3 - Jason Jones (actor), Canadian actor and comedian
 June 5 - Ron Livingston, American actor
 June 6 
Paul Giamatti, American actor
Max Casella, American actor
 June 15 - Fred Tatasciore, American voice actor
 June 19
Chris Larkin, English actor
Mia Sara, American actress
 June 20 - Nicole Kidman, Australian actress
 June 28 - Gil Bellows, Canadian actor, screenwriter and director
 June 29 - Melora Hardin, American actress and singer
 July 1
Pamela Anderson, American actress
Ritchie Coster, English actor
 July 9 - Indrek Taalmaa, Estonian actor
 July 14 - Mary Woodvine, British actress
 July 16 - Will Ferrell, American actor
 July 18 - Vin Diesel, American actor
 July 20
Reed Diamond, American actor
Julian Rhind-Tutt, English actor
 July 22 
 Rhys Ifans, Welsh actor and singer
 Irene Bedard, American actress
 July 23 - Philip Seymour Hoffman, American actor (d. 2014)
 July 25 - Matt LeBlanc, American actor
 July 26 - Jason Statham, English actor
 July 27 - Jill Messick, American producer (d. 2018)
 July 31 - Rodney Harvey, American actor (d. 1998)
 August 4 - Timothy Adams (actor), American actor and model
 August 7 - Edoardo Costa, Italian-born actor
 August 13 - Quinn Cummings, American former child actress
 August 19 - Lucy Briers, English actress
 August 21 - Carrie-Anne Moss, Canadian actress
 August 22
Adewale Akinnuoye-Agbaje, British actor and director
Ty Burrell, American actor
 August 25 - Tom Hollander, English actor
 September 7 - Leslie Jones, American comedian and actress
 September 11 - Harry Connick, Jr., American actor and singer
 September 12 – Louis C.K., American stand-up comedian, writer, actor and filmmaker
 September 14
Dan Cortese, American actor and director
Patrick O'Neal (sportscaster), American former actor and reporter
 September 20 - Kristen Johnston, American actress
 September 25 - Saffron Henderson, Canadian voice actress and singer
 September 28 - Mira Sorvino, American actress
 October 2 - Lew Temple, American actor
 October 3 - Tiara Jacquelina, Malaysian actress
 October 4 - Liev Schreiber, American actor
 October 5 - Guy Pearce, Australian actor
 October 7 - Khan Bonfils, Korean-Danish actor (d. 2014)
 October 11 - Artie Lange, American actor and comedian
 October 15 - Götz Otto, German actor
 October 28 - Julia Roberts, American actress
 October 29
Joely Fisher, American actress and singer
Rufus Sewell, English thespian
 November 2 - Akira Ishida, Japanese actor and voice actor
 November 6 - Rebecca Schaeffer, American actress and model (d. 1989)
 November 10 - Michael Jai White, American actor
 November 11 - Frank John Hughes, American actor and screenwriter
 November 13
 Juhi Chawla, Indian actress
 Jimmy Kimmel, American television host, actor, comedian, writer and producer
 Steve Zahn, American actor
 November 16 - Lisa Bonet, American actress
 November 17 - Dean Lorey, American actor, writer and producer
 November 22 - Mark Ruffalo, American actor
 November 23 - Robert Popper, British producer, writer and actor
 November 25 
 Gregg Turkington, Australian-born American entertainer, actor, musician and writer
 Kazuya Nakai, Japanese voice actor and narrator
 November 28 - Anna Nicole Smith, American model and actress (d. 2007)
 December 1 - Stephen Blackehart, American character actor, author and producer
 December 5 - Joseph Barbara (actor), American actor
 December 6 - Judd Apatow, American comedian, director, producer and screenwriter
 December 8 - Kotono Mitsuishi, Japanese voice actress, actress, singer and narrator
 December 11
Peter Kelamis, Australian-Canadian actor
Mo'Nique, American actress
 December 13 - Jamie Foxx, American actor
 December 14 - Janne Mortil, Canadian-American actress
 December 16 - Miranda Otto, Australian actress
 December 18 - Robert Wahlberg, American actor
 December 26 - Steve Le Marquand, Australian actor

Deaths
 January 8 – Zbigniew Cybulski, 39, Polish actor, Ashes and Diamonds, The Saragossa Manuscript
 January 21 – Ann Sheridan, 51, American actress, Angels with Dirty Faces, Kings Row
 January 22 – Jobyna Ralston, 67, American actress, Wings, The Freshman
 January 28
 Ruut Tarmo, 70, Estonian actor, Noored kotkad
Václav Wasserman, 68, Czech actor, screenwriter and director, The Undertaker, Saturday
 February 1 - Richard L. Breen, 48, American screenwriter, Captain Newman, M.D., Titanic 
 February 6 – Martine Carol, 46, French actress, Lola Montes, Around the World in 80 Days
 February 10 – Ralph Murphy, 71, American director, I Want a Divorce, 70,000 Witnesses
 February 13 – Forugh Farrokhzad, 32, Iranian poet and film director, The House Is Black, in automobile accident
 February 14 – Sig Ruman, 82, German actor, Stalag 17, Ninotchka
 February 15 – Antonio Moreno, 79, Spanish-American actor and director, The Searchers, Creature from the Black Lagoon
 February 16
 Smiley Burnette, 55, American actor, King of the Cowboys, Ridin' on a Rainbow
 Amund Rydland, 79, Norwegian actor 
 February 17 - Louise Henry, 55, American actress, There Goes the Groom, 45 Fathers
 February 21
Charles Beaumont, 38, American television and film writer, Brain Dead, The Intruder
William Newell, 73, American actor, Who Is Hope Schuyler?, Our Miss Brooks
 February 24 – Franz Waxman, 60, German film composer, Stalag 17, Mister Roberts
 March 5 – Mischa Auer, 61, Russian actor, You Can't Take It With You, Destry Rides Again
 March 6 – Nelson Eddy, 65, American singer and actor, Make Mine Music, The Chocolate Soldier
 March 11 – Geraldine Farrar, 85, American singer and actress, Carmen, Joan the Woman
 April 10 - Aage Winther-Jørgensen, 66, Danish actor, The Rector of Veilbye, Bussen 
 April 15 – Totò, 69, Italian actor and writer, Big Deal on Madonna Street, The Hawks and the Sparrows
 April 22 - Tom Conway, 62, Russian-American actor, The Falcon's Brother, Cat People
 April 24
 Fred C. Newmeyer, 78, American director, Safety Last!, They Never Come Back 
 Frank Overton, 49, American actor, To Kill a Mockingbird, Fail-Safe
 April 29 - Anthony Mann, 60, American director, El Cid, Winchester '73
 May 7 - Judith Evelyn, 58, American actress, Rear Window, Giant
 May 8
 LaVerne Andrews, 55, American singer and actress (Andrews Sisters), Road to Rio, Follow the Boys
 Barbara Payton, 39, American actress, Bride of the Gorilla, Kiss Tomorrow Goodbye
 May 14 - James Tinling, 78, American director, Charlie Chan in Shanghai, 45 Fathers
 May 30 – Claude Rains, 77, British actor, Casablanca, Notorious, Mr. Smith Goes to Washington, The Invisible Man
 June 7 - Dorothy Parker, 73, American writer, A Star Is Born, Saboteur
 June 10 
Spencer Tracy, 67, American actor, Boys Town, Judgment at Nuremberg, Guess Who's Coming to Dinner, It's a Mad, Mad, Mad, Mad World
Frank Butler, 76, British-American screenwriter, Going My Way, Road to Morocco
 June 16 – Reginald Denny, 75, British actor, Rebecca, Mr. Blandings Builds His Dream House
 June 26 – Françoise Dorléac, 25, French actress, The Soft Skin, Cul-de-sac
 June 29 – Jayne Mansfield, 34, American actress, The Wayward Bus, The Girl Can't Help It
 July 8 – Vivien Leigh, 53, British actress, Gone with the Wind, A Streetcar Named Desire
 July 17
Enzo Petito, 69, Italian actor, The Good, the Bad and the Ugly
Cyril Ring, 74, American actor, Melody Parade, Mystery of the 13th Guest
 July 21
 Basil Rathbone, 75, British actor, The Adventures of Robin Hood, The Adventures of Sherlock Holmes
 David Weisbart, 52, American film editor and producer, Rebel Without a Cause, Them!
 August 9 – Anton Walbrook, 70, Austrian actor, La Ronde, The Life and Death of Colonel Blimp
 August 13 – Jane Darwell, 87, American actress, The Grapes of Wrath, Gone with the Wind
 August 25 – Paul Muni, 71, Ukrainian-American actor, Scarface, I Am a Fugitive from a Chain Gang
 August 28 – Maurice Elvey, 79, English director and producer, The Life Story of David Lloyd George, The Hound of the Baskervilles
 September 1 - James Dunn, 65, American actor, A Tree Grows in Brooklyn, Bright Eyes
 October 12 - Nat Pendleton, 72, American actor, former Olympic swimmer, The Thin Man, The Great Ziegfeld
 October 29 - Julien Duvivier, 71, French director, Tales of Manhattan, Flesh and Fantasy 
 October 30 - Charles Trowbridge, 85, American actor, Sergeant York, Strange Alibi
 November 1 - Benita Hume, 61, British actress, The Worst Woman in Paris?, The Private Life of Don Juan
 November 4 - June Thorburn, 36, British actress, The Scarlet Blade, The 3 Worlds of Gulliver
 November 9 - Charles Bickford, 76, American actor, Days of Wine and Roses, The Song of Bernadette
 November 21 - Florence Reed, 84, American actress, The Eternal Mother, Great Expectations
 November 29 - Theo Marcuse, 47, American actor, The Cincinnati Kid, Harum Scarum
 December 4
 Bert Lahr, 72, American actor, The Wizard of Oz, Sing Your Worries Away
 Sarah Padden, 86, American actress, Women Won't Tell, The Midnight Lady
 December 14 - Frank Moran, 80, American boxer and actor, Sailor's Luck, Return of the Ape Man
 December 21 - Stuart Erwin, 64, American actor, Pigskin Parade, Going Hollywood
 December 23 - Kaaren Verne, 49, German actress, All Through the Night, Sherlock Holmes and the Secret Weapon
 December 29 - Paul Whiteman, 77, American bandleader, King of Jazz, Thanks a Million

Film debuts 
Joe Don Baker - Cool Hand Luke
Tom Baker - The Winter's Tale
Robby Benson - Wait Until Dark
Eileen Brennan - Divorce American Style
Gary Busey - The Love-Ins
Cher - Good Times
Bud Cort - Up the Down Staircase
Richard Dreyfuss - Valley of the Dolls
Faye Dunaway - Hurry Sundown
Marshall Efron - Funnyman
Robert Forster - Reflections in a Golden Eye
James Gammon - Cool Hand Luke
Dustin Hoffman - The Tiger Makes Out
Anthony Hopkins - The White Bus
Barry Humphries - Bedazzled
Anjelica Huston - Casino Royale
Freddie Jones - Marat/Sade
Harvey Keitel - Who's That Knocking at My Door
Tim Matheson - Divorce American Style
Pat Morita - Thoroughly Modern Millie
Michael Murphy - Double Trouble
Richard Pryor - The Busy Body
Charles Nelson Reilly - The Tiger Makes Out
Rob Reiner - Enter Laughing
Ian Richardson - Marat/Sade
John P. Ryan - The Tiger Makes Out
Rade Šerbedžija - Iluzija
Martin Sheen - The Incident
Jan-Michael Vincent - The Hardy Boys: The Mystery of the Chinese Junk
Jon Voight - Fearless Frank
Lesley Ann Warren - The Happiest Millionaire
Gene Wilder - Bonnie and Clyde
Fred Willard - Teenage Mother
Scott Wilson - In the Heat of the Night
Paul Winfield - The Perils of Pauline
Michael York - The Taming of the Shrew
Anthony Zerbe - Cool Hand Luke

Notes

References

 
Film by year